Sir Louis Randall Tull KA SC MP (born 27 January 1938) is a Barbados criminal attorney-at-Law and former BLP Member of Parliament.

Career
Louis Randall Tull was born in Lears, Saint Michael, Barbados on 27 January 1938.

Having specialized in criminal law, Tull worked successfully at the Bar in Barbados during 1968.

His first political appointment was as Minister of Education and Culture in 1976. In 1971 he became a Senator in the Barbados Senate and in 1976 an elected Member of Parliament in the House Assembly Barbados, Bridgetown between 1976 and 1981.

In 1975 as Minister of Education and Culture, Tull attended and gave a speech at the opening ceremony where Her Majesty the Queen and Prince Philip unveiled the plaque for Barbados Community College’s $2.8 million expansion of its laboratories, auditoriums, gymnasium, library and student center in Bridgetown (1970-1975).

Tull has been a popular and distinguished Minister of Education and Culture and a dedicated representative of St. George South since 1976. As Minister of Education and Culture, he introduced the new Education Act which became law in May this year and initiated the planning for the CARIFESTA programme, after winning Barbados as the venue for the fourth Caribbean Festival.

In 1979 he represented the BLP party in St. Philip (South) and in 1981 wins by 1,623 votes.

He was appointed Queen's Counsel in 1981 and Attorney-General, minister foreign affairs between 1981 and 1985 (succeeded Mr. Henry Forde); Minister of commerce, industry and consumer affairs for 1985/1986 and a Member of the Senate from 1986.

The nearby island of Grenada was going through a political crisis in 1983 and Barbados’ Prime Minister at the time, Tom Adams, had an intense dislike of Bishop of Grenada but Foreign Minister Tull was not sold on the idea of any invasion and thought he might turn Bishop so on 21 Jan 1983 went as a delegate to Cuna for talks.

On 3 Dec 1997, as special envoy of the Minister of Foreign Affairs for Barbados, Mr Tull was at the signing ceremony of the Mine Ban Treaty which committed Barbados and the Caribbean are a landline-free zone.

Honours and awards

Among some of his achievements, Tull was decorated in 1981 with the highest Colombian award, "The Great Cross of Boyaca" by Dr. Carlos Simmonds, Colombia's Minister of Foreign Affairs. He was also appointed to the Bar at the Inner Temple, London as Barbados' newest Queen's Counsel.

Awarded Legal Education Certificate on 14 September 1984 from Ocho Rios, Jamaica.

He was made Membership of UWI Campus Council Cave Hill between 2005 and 2006.

For his service to the country, in November 2006, Tull received the Knight of St Andrew, an award within the Order of Barbados introduced by Barbados in 1980.

References

Barbadian knights
Barbadian lawyers
Lawyers awarded knighthoods
Members of the Parliament of Barbados
Members of the Senate of Barbados
Members of the House of Assembly of Barbados
Attorneys-General of Barbados
Barbadian Queen's Counsel
Knights and Dames of St Andrew (Barbados)
Living people
1938 births